National Lampoon: Lemmings, a spinoff of the humor magazine National Lampoon, was a 1973 stage show that helped launch the performing careers of John Belushi, Christopher Guest, and Chevy Chase. The show was co-written and co-directed by a number of people including Sean Kelly. The show opened at The Village Gate on January 25, 1973, and ran for 350 performances.

The songs from the show were subsequently issued as a record album. A video of one of the original performances, National Lampoon: Lemmings: Dead in Concert 1973, was eventually made available several decades later.

Plot

The first half of the show was sketch comedy; the second half was a mock rock festival, "Woodshuck: Three Days of Peace, Love and Death", a parody of "Woodstock: Three Days of Peace and Music." "Woodshuck" featured spoofs of Woodstock performers, including Joe Cocker  and Joan Baez, as well as parodies of John Denver, Bob Dylan and James Taylor, plus songs performed by fictional groups (e.g., the "Motown Manifestoes" singing "Papa was a Running Dog Lackey of the Bourgeoisie").

Acts
 Welcome to the Woodshuck Festival: Three Days of Peace, Love, and Death; plus band introductions throughout - John Belushi
 Freud, Marx, Engels, and Jung, performing "Lemmings Lament." - A parody of Crosby, Stills, Nash & Young, and the songs "Woodstock", "Long Time Gone", and others. (Also referred to in performance as Freud, Pavlov, Adler, and Jung)
 Bob Dylan, performing "Positively Wall Street," a parody of several of his styles, with the title taken from "Positively 4th Street" - Christopher Guest
 Goldie Oldie, a parody of old, 1950s-style performers, performing "Pizza Man," a parody of the "teen tragedy" songs - Alice Playten
 John Denver, performing "Colorado" - Chevy Chase
 Joan Baez, performing "Pull the Triggers, Niggers," a parody of her protest songs and of Dylan's song "George Jackson," in particular. Listed on the album cover as "Pull the Tregroes, Negroes." - Mary Jenifer Mitchell (later replaced by Rhonda Coullet)
 Joe Cocker, "Lonely at the Bottom" - Belushi as Cocker, Paul Jacobs as Leon Russell on piano.
 James Taylor, "Highway Toes," a parody of his heroin abuse - Christopher Guest
 Motown Manifestoes singing "Papa was a Running Dog Lackey of the Bourgeoisie" (parody of "Papa Was a Rollin' Stone"), with most of its lines taken from The Communist Manifesto.
 Donovan, "Nirvana Banana" - Peter Elbling  (later addition to the show).
 Joni Mitchell, "I Do for You" - Alice Playten (replaced by Rhonda Coullet).
 Farmer Yassir (parody of Max Yasgur, owner of the land on which Woodstock was held), greeting the audience - Gary Goodrow
 Megadeath, a parody of heavy metal groups, who end their act by turning the amps so loud that the audience dies.
 "Jackie Christ, Superstar." Parody of "Jesus Christ, Superstar." Jesus is a stand-up comedian, while John Belushi played King Herod.
 "Deteriorata." A Tony Hendra parody of Les Crane's recording of "Desiderata."
 "Defeat Day" - a parody of America's first military defeat in the Vietnam War. "Put all your troubles in a nickel bag and smile, smile, smile."
 The Rolling Stones Parody, with Alice Playten playing "Mick Jagger."

Cast
The cast included:
 John Belushi - bass guitar
 Chevy Chase - drums
 Garry Goodrow - sax
 Christopher Guest - guitar
 Paul Jacobs -guitar, piano
 Mary Jenifer Mitchell
 Alice Playten

Later cast replacements:
 Rhonda Coullet
 Nate Herman
 Bob Hoban
 Zal Yanovsky
 Tony Scheuren
 Peter Elbling
 Archie Hahn
 John Wall

Production

Writers
The writers included:
 Christopher Guest – music, musical arrangements
 Paul Jacobs – music, musical arrangements, musical director
 John Belushi
 Sean Kelly
 Tony Hendra
 David Axlerod

Reception

Awards
 Alice Playten – 1973 Obie Award for Distinguished Performance

Cast recording

A cast recording of the show was released in 1973, with album cover art by Melinda Bordelon.

Track listing

Side One
 Stage Announcements Performed by John Belushi
 "Lemmings Lament" Lead vocal by Paul Jacobs (as David Crosby); instruments and backup vocals by the cast; written by Paul Jacobs and Sean Kelly.
 Stage Announcements Performed by John Belushi
 "Positively Wall Street" Lead vocal by Christopher Guest (as Bob Dylan); instruments and backup vocals by the cast; written by Paul Jacobs, Christopher Guest, and Sean Kelly.
 Weather Person Performed by Garry Goodrow
 "Pizza Man" Lead vocal by Alice Playten (as Goldie Oldie); instruments and back-up vocals by the cast; written by Christopher Guest, Sean Kelly, and Tony Hendra
 Stage Announcements Performed by John Belushi
 "Colorado" Lead vocal by Chevy Chase; instruments and backup vocals by the cast; written by Christopher Guest, Sean Kelly, and Tony Hendra
 Richie Havens Performed by Christopher Guest (as Richie Havens)
 Crowd Rain Chant Performed by John Belushi

Side Two
 Stage Announcements Performed by John Belushi
 "Papa Was a Running Dog Lackey" of the Bourgeoisie Lead vocal by Paul Jacobs; instruments and backup vocals by the cast; written by Paul Jacobs and Tony Hendra
 All-Star Dead Band Performed by John Belushi
 Stage Announcements Performed by John Belushi
 "Highway Toes" Lead vocal by Christopher Guest (as James Taylor); instruments and backup vocals by the cast; written by Christopher Guest and Sean Kelly
 Hell's Angel Performed by Chevy Chase
 Stage Announcements Performed by John Belushi
 Farmer Yassir Performed by Garry Goodrow
 "Lonely at the Bottom" Lead vocal by John Belushi (as Joe Cocker); instruments and backup vocals by the cast; written by Paul Jacobs and John Belushi
 Megagroupie Performed by Alice Playten
 "Megadeath" Lead vocal by John Belushi; instruments and backup vocals by the cast; written by Paul Jacobs and Sean Kelly

See also
 List of National Lampoon films

References

External links
 Original Off-Broadway Cast, National Lampoon's Lemmings (Blue Thumb, 1973; Decca Records, 2002)
 National Lampoon's Lemmings at the Internet Off Broadway Database
 

Lemmings
Lemmings
Off-Broadway musicals
1970s comedy albums
1973 soundtrack albums
1973 musicals
Blue Thumb Records albums